Ayineh ( lit. "The Mirror") is an Iranian newspaper in the Fars region. The Concessionaire of this newspaper was Morteza Shojaossadat and it was published in Shiraz since 1910.

See also
List of magazines and newspapers of Fars

References

Newspapers published in Iran
Persian-language newspapers